ENZSO was an orchestral project started by former Split Enz keyboardist Eddie Rayner. It combines the New Zealand Symphony Orchestra with contemporary pop singers to perform Split Enz songs.

History
The project began with Eddie Rayner. He wanted something more from the old Split Enz songs, and doing orchestral arrangements seemed perfect. Creating the arrangements on his synthesiser, with help from Dave Woodcock, Eddie approached Mark Keyworth of the New Zealand Symphony Orchestra to ask the orchestra to play his arrangements; Keyworth gladly agreed.

With conductor Peter Scholes, the New Zealand Symphony Orchestra, Dave Dobbyn, Annie Crummer, Sam Hunt, Neil Finn, Tim Finn and the New Zealand Youth Choir, they recorded and released their first album in 1996 simply titled ENZSO. Again in 1999 ENZSO recorded a second album titled ENZSO 2.

A film of the collaboration was made by director Justin Pemberton called ENZSO: Dirty Creature.

Discography

Albums

Singles

References

External links
 Page about the ENZSO project
 Interview with Eddie Rayner about ENZSO

New Zealand rock music groups